Tadanobu (written: 忠信 or 忠忱) is a masculine Japanese given name. Notable people with the name include:

 (born 1973), Japanese actor
 (1862–1897), Japanese daimyō
 (1161–1186), Japanese samurai
, Japanese writer

Japanese masculine given names